Frederick Webb Headley (10 April 1856 – 25 November 1919) was an English naturalist and author of books on evolution and Darwinism.

Frederick was the second son of Rev. Henry Headley, of Brinsop Vicarage, Herefordshire. He was educated at Harrow School and
the University of Cambridge, graduating in 1878, later becoming Assistant Master at Haileybury College, Hertfordshire,
where he remained until shortly before his death following an operation.

He was a member of the British Ornithologists' Union and a Fellow of the Zoological Society of London.

Bibliography
The Structure and Life of Birds, London and New York, Macmillan and Co. (1895)
Problems of Evolution, London, Duckworth (1900)
Fauna and Flora of Haileybury, Hartford, Stephen Austin (1902)
Darwinism and Modern Socialism, London, Methuen (1909)
The Flight of Birds, London, Witherby & Co. (1912)
The Country Round Haileybury, Cambridge, University Press (private printing, 1920)
This last title was left unfinished at Headley's death; it was completed for the press by W. Kennedy, who also added a second section on local history and antiquities.

References

1856 births
1919 deaths
English naturalists
19th-century English writers
20th-century British writers
People educated at Harrow School
Alumni of Gonville and Caius College, Cambridge
English zoologists
Fellows of the Zoological Society of London
English ornithologists